Microlophus quadrivittatus, the four-banded Pacific iguana, is a species of lava lizard found in the Pacific coast of Peru and Chile.

References

quadrivittatus
Lizards of South America
Reptiles of Chile
Reptiles of Peru
Reptiles described in 1845
Taxa named by Johann Jakob von Tschudi